Gibbula is a genus of small sea snails, marine gastropod molluscs in the subfamily Cantharidinae  of the family Trochidae, the top snails.

Taxonomy
Affenzeller et al. (2017) have shown than several Mediterranean species hitherto assigned to Gibbula were forming a separate clade and should be assigned to the genus Steromphala. They included in the restricted Gibbula clade the species G. magus (type species), G. fanulum and G. ardens. However many other species were not taken into account in this paper and will remain listed in WoRMS under Gibbula until their phylogenetic position is assessed, but possibly do not belong to the restricted Gibbula clade.

Distribution
The species in this genus occur through all seas, except on the coast of the American continent.

Description
The cyrtoconoid (= approaching a conical shape but with convex sides) shell is usually perforate or umbilicate. The spire is moderately elevated. The whorls are often gibbous or tuberculose beneath the sutures, smooth or spirally ribbed. The last whorl is generally angular at the periphery. The aperture is subrhomboidal. The columella is oblique, dentate or subsinuous at the base. The outer lip is acute. The central tooth and the lateral teeth of the radula have well-developed denticulate cusps. The outer lateral teeth are wider.

Species
Species within the genus Gibbula include.

 Gibbula ahena Preston, 1908
 Gibbula albida Gmelin, 1791
 † Gibbula anodosula Sacco, 1896
 Gibbula ardens Von Salis, 1793)
 Gibbula aurantia Nordsieck, 1975
 Gibbula beckeri G.B. Sowerby III, 1901
 Gibbula benzi (Krauss, 1848) 
 Gibbula blanfordiana G. Nevill & H. Nevill, 1869
 † Gibbula buchi Harzhauser and Kowalke, 2002 (Dubois, 1831)
 Gibbula candei d'Orbigny, 1844
 Gibbula capensis Gmelin, 1791
 Gibbula cicer (Menke, 1844)
 † Gibbula clanculiforma Landau, Van Dingenen & Ceulemans, 2017 
 Gibbula clandestina Rolán & Templado, 2001
 † Gibbula conicomagus Landau, Van Dingenen & Ceulemans, 2017 
 Gibbula corallioides Locard, 1898
 † Gibbula dalli Ihering, 1897
 Gibbula delgadensis Nordsieck, 1982
 Gibbula denizi Rolán & Swinnen, 2013
 Gibbula deversa Milaschewitsch, 1916
 Gibbula drepanensis Brugnone, 1873
 Gibbula dupontiana G. Nevill & H. Nevill, 1869
 Gibbula eikoae Tagaro & Dekker, 2006
 † Gibbula euomphala (Philippi, 1836)
 Gibbula fanulum Gmelin, 1791
 † Gibbula filiformis (de Rayneval, Van den Hecke & Ponzi, 1854) 
 Gibbula guishanensis Wen-Der Chen & I-Feng Fu, 2008
 Gibbula guttadauri Philippi, 1836
 Gibbula hera Bartsch, 1915
 Gibbula hisseyiana (Tenison-Woods, 1876)
 Gibbula houartiPoppe, Tagaro & Dekker, 2006
 Gibbula joubini Dautzenberg, 1910
 Gibbula leucophaea (Philippi, 1836)
 Gibbula loculosa Gould, 1861 (synonym of Gibbula benzi)
 Gibbula magus (Linnaeus, 1758)
 † Gibbula marianae Landau, Van Dingenen & Ceulemans, 2017 
 Gibbula massieri Rolán & Zettler, 2010
 † Gibbula megamagus Cossmann, 1918
 † Gibbula mirabilis (Deshayes, 1863) 
 Gibbula multicolor (Krauss, 1848)
 † Gibbula parnensis (Bayan, 1870) 
 Gibbula philberti (Récluz, C., 1843)
 † Gibbula podolica Harzhauser and Kowalke, 2002 (Dubois, 1831)
 † Gibbula provosti Ceulemans, Van Dingenen & Landau, 2016 
 Gibbula racketti Payraudeau, 1826
 Gibbula rifaca Bartsch, 1915
 † Gibbula saeniensis Chirli & Micali, 2003 
 Gibbula sari Fischer-Piette, E., 1942
 Gibbula sementis Rolán & Templado, 2001
 Gibbula senegalensis Menke, 1853
 Gibbula spurca Gould, 1856
 Gibbula stoliczkana (Nevill, G. & H. Nevill, 1869)
 Gibbula subplicata G. Nevill & H. Nevill, 1869
 Gibbula tantilla Monterosato, 1890
 Gibbula tenuilirata Preston, 1909
 † Gibbula tindayaensis Martín-González & Vera-Peláez, 2018 
 Gibbula tingitana Pallary, 1901
 Gibbula tryoni Pilsbry, 1889
 Gibbula tumida (Montagu, 1803)
 Gibbula turbinoides Deshayes, 1835
 Gibbula vanwalleghemi Poppe, G.T., S. Tagaro & H. Dekker, 2006
 Gibbula verdensis Rolán & Templado, 2001
 Gibbula vimontiae Monterosato, 1884
 Gibbula zonata (Woods, 1828)

Taxon inquirendum
 Gibbula incitabilis Locard, 1904
 Gibbula sculpturata Locard, 1898

Species brought into synonymy
 Gibbula (Calliotrochus) cummingae Kilburn, 1977: synonym of Calliotrochus marmoreus (Pease, 1861)
 Gibbula adansonii Payraudeau, 1826: synonym of Steromphala adansonii (Payraudeau, 1826)
 Gibbula adriatica Philippi, 1844: synonym of Steromphala adriatica (Philippi, 1844)
 Gibbula aegyptica Chenu, 1859: synonym of Gibbula fanulum (Gmelin, 1791)
 Gibbula affinis cognata Pilsbry, H.A., 1903: synonym of Clanculus cognatus (Pilsbry, 1903)
 Gibbula aglaia Bartsch, 1915: synonym of Gibbula tryoni Pilsbry, 1889
 Gibbula altimirai Nordsieck 1982: synonym of Gibbula nivosa A. Adams, 1851
 Gibbula apicalis Nordsieck 1972: synonym of Gibbula ardens Von Salis, 179)
 Gibbula approximata Turton, 1932: synonym of Gibbula cicer (Menke, 1844)
 Gibbula articulata (Gould, 1861): synonym of Pseudominolia articulata (Gould, 1861)
 Gibbula aurantia Nordsieck, F. & F. García-Talavera, 1979 : synonym of Gibbula racketti (Payraudeau, 1826) 
 Gibbula awajiensis G. B. Sowerby III, 1914: synonym of Conotalopia mustelina (Gould, 1861)
 Gibbula barbara Monterosato 1884: synonym of Gibbula ardens Von Salis, 179)
 Gibbula bellinii Coen 1930: synonym of Gibbula magus (Linnaeus, 1758)
 Gibbula becki Turton, 1932: synonym of Gibbula multicolor (Krauss, 1848)
 Gibbula bicolor Risso 1826: synonym of Gibbula ardens Von Salis, 179)
 Gibbula cineraria Linnaeus, 1758: synonym of Steromphala cineraria (Linnaeus, 1758)
 Gibbula concinna (Philippi, 1847): synonym of Eurytrochus concinnus (Pilsbry, 1889)
 Gibbula conemenosi Monterosato 1888: synonym of Gibbula adansonii (Payraudeau, 1826)
 Gibbula cummingae Kilburn, 1977: synonym of Calliotrochus marmoreus (Pease, 1861)
 Gibbula danieli (Crosse, 1862): synonym of Eurytrochus danieli (Crosse, 1862)
 Gibbula declivis Forskål, 1775: synonym of Rubritrochus declivis (Forskål, 1775)
 Gibbula De Gregorii Caramagna, 1888: synonym of Ethminolia degregorii (Caramagna, 1888)
 Gibbula delicata Coen 1937: synonym of Gibbula leucophaea (Philippi, 1836)
 Gibbula distincta Turton, 1932: synonym of Gibbula multicolor (Krauss, 1848)
 Gibbula divaricata Linnaeus, 1758: synonym of Steromphala divaricata (Linnaeus, 1758)
 Gibbula docastana Preston, 1909: synonym of Eurytrochus strangei (Adams, A., 1853)
 Gibbula filosa Garrett, 1872: synonym of Eurytrochus danieli (Crosse, 1862)
 Gibbula forskadauri Nordsieck 1982: synonym of Gibbula magus (Linnaeus, 1758)
 Gibbula fucata Gould, 1861: synonym of Gibbula multicolor (Krauss, 1848)
 Gibbula fulgens Gould, 1861: synonym of Gibbula cicer (Menke, 1844)
 Gibbula funiculata Carpenter, 1864: synonym of Lirularia lirulata (Carpenter, 1864)
 Gibbula galbina Hedley & May, 1908: synonym of Nanula galbina H(edley & May, 1908)
 Gibbula gaudiosa Gould, 1861: synonym of Gibbula cicer (Menke, 1844)
 Gibbula gibbosula Brusina, 1865: synonym of Gibbula racketti (Payraudeau, 1826)
 Gibbula globulosa Turton, 1932: synonym of Gibbula cicer (Menke, 1844)
 Gibbula gorgonarum P. Fisher, 1883: synonym of Callumbonella suturalis (Philippi, 1836)
 Gibbula huberi Oberling, 1970: synonym of Gibbula vimontiae Monterosato, 1884
 Gibbula incinta Sowerby, 1894: synonym of Gibbula tryoni Pilsbry, 1889
 Gibbula ivanicsi Brusina: synonym of Gibbula adansonii Payraudeau, 1826
 Gibbula isseli Monterosato, 1888: synonym of Gibbula racketti (Payraudeau, 1826)
 Gibbula kalinota Adams A. 1851: synonym of Gibbula ardens Von Salis, 179)
 Gibbula kowiensis Turton, 1932: synonym of Gibbula benzi (Krauss, 1848)
 Gibbula lacunata Carpenter, 1864: synonym of Lirularia lirulata (Carpenter, 1864)
 Gibbula lauta Turton, 1932: synonym of Gibbula multicolor (Krauss, 1848)
 Gibbula legrandi Tate, R. & May, W.L. 1901: synonym of Minopa legrandi (Petterd, 1879)
 Gibbula macculochi Hedley, 1907: synonym of Eurytrochus maccullochi (Hedley, C., 1907)
 Gibbula marmorea (Pease, 1861): synonym of Calliotrochus marmoreus (Pease, 1861)
 Gibbula medusa Bartsch, 1915: synonym of Gibbula tryoni Pilsbry, 1890
 Gibbula micans Suter, 1897: synonym of Cantharidus artizona A. Adams, 1853
 Gibbula miniata (Anton, 1838): synonym of Clanculus miniatus (Anton, 1838)
 Gibbula musiva Gould, 1861: synonym of Gibbula cicer (Menke, 1844)
 Gibbula nassauiensis "Chemnitz, J.H." Stearns, R.E.C., 1893: synonym of Gibbula senegalensis Menke, 1853
 Gibbula nivosa A. Adams, 1851: synonym of Steromphala nivosa (A. Adams, 1853)
 Gibbula obesula Locard, 1898: synonym of Calliostoma obesulum (Locard, 1898)
 Gibbula obliquata (Gmelin, 1791): synonym of Gibbula umbilicalis (da Costa, 1778)
 Gibbula optabilis Carpenter, 1864: synonym of Lirularia lirulata (Carpenter, 1864)
 Gibbula ornata Turton, 1932: synonym of Gibbula multicolor (Krauss, 1848)
 Gibbula pantanellii Caramagna, 1888: synonym of Monilea pantanellii (Caramagna, 1888)
 Gibbula parcipicta Carpenter, 1864: synonym of Lirularia lirulata (Carpenter, 1864)
 Gibbula pennanti (Philippi, 1846): synonym of Steromphala pennanti (Philippi, 1846)
 Gibbula perspectiva G.B. Sowerby, 1900: synonym of Agagus agagus Jousseaume, 1894
 Gibbula pintado Gould, 1861: synonym of Gibbula benzi (Krauss, 1848)
 Gibbula phasianella (Deshayes, 1863): synonym of Calliotrochus marmoreus (Pease, 1861)
 Gibbula polychroma Turton, 1932: synonym of Gibbula multicolor (Krauss, 1848)
 Gibbula protumida Locard 1886: synonym of Gibbula magus (Linnaeus, 1758)
 Gibbula pseudotumida Nordsieck, 1982: synonym of Gibbula racketti (Payraudeau, 1826)
 Gibbula pulchella Turton, 1932: synonym of Gibbula multicolor (Krauss, 1848)
 Gibbula pulcherrima A. Adams, 1855: synonym of Rubritrochus pulcherrimus (A. Adams, 1855)
 Gibbula punctocostata A. Adams, 1853: synonym of Astele punctocostata (A. Adams, 1853)
 Gibbula purpurata Brusina, 1865: synonym of Gibbula rarilineata (Michaud, 1829)
 Gibbula purpurea Coen 1930: synonym of Gibbula albida Gmelin, 1791
 Gibbula pygmaea Risso, 1826: synonym of Gibbula racketti (Payraudeau, 1826)
 Gibbula rarilineata Michaud, 1829: synonym of Steromphala rarilineata (Michaud, 1829)
 Gibbula richardi (Payraudeau, 1826): synonym of Phorcus richardi (Payraudeau, 1826)
 Gibbula rotella Monterosato 1888: synonym of Gibbula nivosa A. Adams, 1851
 Gibbula redimita Gould, 1861: synonym of Lirularia redimita (Gould, 1861)
 Gibbula reedi Verco, 1907: synonym of Fossarina (Minopa) reedi (Verco, 1907)
 Gibbula reevei (Montrouzier in Souverbie & Montrouzier, 1866): synonym of Trochus reevei Montrouzier in Souverbie & Montrouzier, 1866
 Gibbula sanguinea Risso 1826: synonym of Gibbula ardens Von Salis, 179)
 Gibbula sepulchralis (Melvill, 1899): synonym of Priotrochus obscurus obscurus (Wood, 1828)
 Gibbula specialis Coen 1937: synonym of Gibbula divaricata (Linnaeus, 1758)
 Gibbula spratti (Forbes, 1844): synonym of Steromphala spratti (Forbes, 1844)
 Gibbula subcincta Monterosato 1888: synonym of Gibbula ardens Von Salis, 179)
 Gibbula sulcosa Adams A. 1851: synonym of Gibbula ardens Von Salis, 179)
 Gibbula sulliottii Monterosato, 1888: synonym of Gibbula adansonii (Payraudeau, 1826)
 Gibbula taiwanensis Chen, 2006: synonym of Pseudotalopia taiwanensis (Chen, 2006)
 Gibbula tasmanica Petterd, 1879: synonym of Nanula tasmanica (Petterd, 1879)
 Gibbula tesserula Tenison-Woods, 1880: synonym of Chlorodiloma odontis (W. Wood, 1828) 
 Gibbula thalia Bartsch, 1915: synonym of Gibbula cicer (Menke, 1844)
 Gibbula thiara Coen 1930: synonym of Gibbula albida Gmelin, 1791
 Gibbula townsendi Sowerby III, 1895: synonym of Agagus agagus Jousseaume, 1894
 Gibbula tuberculosa auct. non d'Orbigny, 1842: synonym of Arene bitleri Olsson & McGinty, 1958
 Gibbula tumidulina Locard, 1904: synonym of Gibbula racketti (Payraudeau, 1826)
 Gibbula umbilicalis (da Costa, 1778), common on the western coast of the U.K. and Ireland: synonym of Steromphala umbilicalis (da Costa, 1778)
 Gibbula umbilicaris (Linnaeus, 1758): synonym of Steromphala umbilicaris (Linnaeus, 1758)
 Gibbula varia (Linnaeus, 1758): synonym of Steromphala varia (Linnaeus, 1758)
 Gibbula variegata Risso, 1826: synonym of Gibbula varia (Linnaeus, 1758)
 Gibbula venusta Adams A. 1851: synonym of Gibbula ardens Von Salis, 179)
 Gibbula virescens Nordsieck 1972: synonym of Gibbula adansonii (Payraudeau, 1826)
 Gibbula vulcanica Coen 1930: synonym of Gibbula magus (Linnaeus, 1758)
 Gibbula whitechurchi Turton, 1932: synonym of Ilanga whitechurchi (Turton, 1932)
 Nomen dubium
 Gibbula rosea (Gmelin, 1791)

References

 Risso, A. (1826). Histoire naturelle des principales productions de l'Europe Méridionale et particulièrement de celles des environs de Nice et des Alpes Maritimes. Paris: F.G. Levrault. Vol. 4: IV, 1-439, 12 pls.
 Tomlin, J.R. le B. (1930). Some preoccupied generic names.—II. Proceedings of the Malacological Society of London. 19: 22–24.
 Fischer-Piette E., Gaillard J.-M. & Kisch B.S. (1962). Les variations, du Nord au Sud, de Gibbula cineraria L. et ses rapports avec Calliostoma strigosum Gmel.. Mémoires du Muséum National d'Histoire Naturelle, nouvelle série, série A, Zoologie 28(1): 32 pp., 12 pl.
 Vaught, K.C. (1989). A classification of the living Mollusca. American Malacologists: Melbourne, FL (USA). . XII, 195 pp.

 Monterosato T. A. (di) (1889 (1 gennaio)). Coquilles marines marocaines. Journal de Conchyliologie 37(1): 20-40; 37(2): 112-121.

External links
 Herrmannsen, A. N. (1846-1852). Indicis Generum Malacozoorum primordia. Fischer, Cassel. Vol. 1: i-xxviii, 1-637 pp. [i-xxviii + 1-104: 1 Sep 1846; 105-232: 1 Dec 1846; 233-360: 1 Mar 1847; 361-488: 18 Apr 1847; 489-616: 25 May 1847; 617-637: 17 Jul 1847; 2: 1-717, xxix-xlii pp. [1-104: 17 Jul 1847; 105-232: 8 Sep 1847; 233-352: 7 Dec 1847; 353-492: 18 Feb 1848; 493-612: Feb 1849; 613-717 + xxix-xliii: Mar 1849]; Supplementa et corrigenda: i-v, 1-140 pp.]
 Monterosato T. A. (di) (1884). Nomenclatura generica e specifica di alcune conchiglie mediterranee. Palermo, Virzi, 152 pp
 Monterosato T. A. (di) (1889 (1 gennaio)). Coquilles marines marocaines. Journal de Conchyliologie 37(1): 20-40; 37(2): 112-121
 Cossmann, M. (1918). Essais de paléoconchologie comparée. Onzième livraison. Paris: published by the author. 388 pp., 11 plates
 Iredale, T. (1918). Molluscan nomenclatural problems and solutions.- No. 1. Proceedings of the Malacological Society of London. 13(1-2): 28-40
 Adams H. & Adams A. (1853-1858). The genera of Recent Mollusca; arranged according to their organization. London, van Voorst.
 Cossmann M. (1920). Rectifications de nomenclature. Revue Critique de Paléozoologie et de Paléophytologie. 24: 137-138
  Gofas, S.; Le Renard, J.; Bouchet, P. (2001). Mollusca. in: Costello, M.J. et al. (eds), European Register of Marine Species: a check-list of the marine species in Europe and a bibliography of guides to their identification. Patrimoines Naturels. 50: 180-213.
  Affenzeller S., Haar N. & Steiner G. (2017). Revision of the genus complex Gibbula: an integrative approach to delineating the Eastern Mediterranean genera Gibbula Risso, 1826, Steromphala Gray, 1847, and Phorcus Risso, 1826 using DNA-barcoding and geometric morphometrics (Vetigastropoda, Trochoidea). Organisms Diversity & Evolution. 17(4): 789-812

 
Trochidae
Extant Late Cretaceous first appearances